MKS Polonia Świdnica is a Polish football club based in Świdnica, Poland. The club currently plays in IV liga.

History
The club has had many names since its foundation on 23 July 1945. They are listed below;
 23.07.1945 – KS [Klub Sportowy] Polonia Świdnica
 1949 – KS Budowlani Świdnica
 1951 – ZKS [Zakładowy Klub Sportowy] Kolejarz Świdnica
 1952 – ZKS Stal Świdnica
 1953 – MKS [Międzyzakładowy Klub Sportowy] Polonia Świdnica
 19?? – MKS [Miejski Klub Sportowy] Polonia Świdnica
 01.07.2005 – MKS Polonia/Sparta Świdnica (after a merger with KP Sparta Świdnica)
 08.08.2014 – MKS Polonia-Stal Świdnica (after a merger with KP Stal Świdnica)

Since 1946 Polonia Świdnica took part in the Polish championship. Polish Championships were played then knockout system up to 1948. The club first won promotion from the district of Wroclaw OZPN, and then lost in the 1/16 finals of the Polish Championship. In the 1947–1948 season first the team advanced to the qualifying tournament, which took third place in Group III and received the right to play in 1949 in the newly formed Second League (D2). After two spent seasons team was ranked the 9th place in 1950 season and was relegated to the regional league. In 1966/67 club played in the third league, group I (Silesia), but the inheritance took 15th place and returned to the regional tournament. After a long break, it was only in 1991/92 the club was again played in the third league, group VII (Lower Silesia), where he finished high 3rd place. Over the next few seasons, players were fighting for promotion to the second league and were close to repeating the success from the past. In the 1997/98 season the team took 15th place in group II (Lower Silesia) III League (D3) and was relegated to the regional league. At the turn of the century club had financial problems. In the 2003/04 season the team won the Class B Świdnica II (D7), and in 2004/05 won the 2nd place in group II Class A, group Wałbrzych II (D6). As another football club from Świdnica Sparta Świdnica (founded in 1995) played in the group of Lower Silesia IV League (D4), Polonia has decided to promote in the class by combining with it. As a result of the merger 1 July 2005, was created a club Polonia/Sparta Świdnica. The club continued with the tradition of the Polonia (front name of the club, date of creation and logo), though he played instead of the Sparta in League IV. In the 2007/08 season the team won a group of Lower Silesia IV League, but in the play-offs for promotion to the new second league defeat of the Czarni Żagań (2:3, 1:2), the following season 2008/09 won the runners-up in group of Lower Silesia-Lubuska III League but in the play-offs for promotion to the second league, again lost, this time with Zagłębie Sosnowiec (0:0, 0:1). August 8, 2014, once again merged, this time with the club in a lower league Stal Świdnica (founded in 1986), who last season took 8th place in the Class District, group Walbrzych (D5). The merger club was renamed to Polonia-Stal Świdnica. Data of foundation – 1945 and the logo of the club reflects the continuation of the history of the Polonia.

Supporters
The club has undergone many name changes as a result of mergers, in 2005 despite fan protests the club was renamed KP Polonia/Sparta Świdnica after a merger with KP Sparta Świdnica. After a merger with another local club Stal Świdnica and creating Polonia-Stal Świdnica in 2014 supporters protests too. There are efforts to return to its historical name and logo.

Honours
Second League (D2)
7th place (1): 1949
Runner-up (3): 1977–78, 1981–82, 2010–11
Polish Cup
1/16 finals (1): 1950–51
Polish Cup OZPN Wałbrzych
Winner (1): 1992–93

Stadium
The Municipal Stadium OSiR in Świdnica, Poland, is located on Śląska Str in the eastern part of the city. It is the home stadium of the Polonia Świdnica football team playing in the Polish Third League. The stadium has a capacity of 3,500 spectators, incl. 1,096 seated.

References

External links
  
 Info on www.90minut.pl

 
Association football clubs established in 1945
1945 establishments in Poland
Świdnica